David Mallet is the name of:

 David Mallet (writer) (c. 1705–1765), Scottish poet and dramatist
 David Mallet (director) (fl. 1970s-2010s), British director

See also
 David Mallett (born 1951, fl. 1990s), American singer-songwriter
 David Malet Armstrong (1926–2014), Australian philosopher